Eternal life or life eternal may refer to:

 Immortality, the ability to live forever
 Eternal life (Christianity), a Christian belief
 "Eternal Life" (song), a 1995 song by Jeff Buckley
 Life Eternal (album), a 2009 album by Mayhem
 Life Eternal (film), a 2015 Austrian-German black comedy crime film
 "Life Eternal" (song), a 2018 song by Ghost
 Eternal Life, a 2018 novel by Dara Horn

See also 
 Eternal (disambiguation)
 Immortal (disambiguation)